SetACL is a freeware utility for manipulating security descriptors on Microsoft Windows. It used to be available under the GNU Lesser General Public License (LGPL) as a command-line utility and as an ActiveX component, but changed to a freeware license in version 3.0.0.0.

Features
This list of features is taken from the product's web page.
 Supports the following object types on Windows 2000 and later
 NTFS files and directories
 registry keys
 printers
 services
 network shares
 WMI objects 
 Manage permissions on local or remote systems in domains or workgroups.
 Set multiple permissions for multiple users or groups in a single command.
 Control how permissions are inherited.
 List, backup and restore permissions.
 All operations work on a single object or recursively on a directory or registry tree.
 Set the owner to any user or group.
 Unicode support.
 Remove, replace or copy a user or group from an ACL.
 Fast performance due to time-consuming steps such as recursing a large file system are performed only once.
 Filter out object names not to be processed.

Usage
To set 'change' permissions on the directory 'C:\angela' for user 'brian' in domain 'dom1':

Remove write and change permission sets from Desktop, replace with 'read and execute' permissions:

An example of its use from AutoIt can be found here.

Short history
 March 2001 SetACL program 0.x development begins
 December 2002 SetACL program 2.x development begins
 April 2003 2.0 beta 1 released
 July 2003 2.0 final released
 September 2003 2.0.1.0 released – Remove, replace or copy all Access Control Entries (ACEs) belonging to users or groups of a specified domain.
 January 2004 2.0.2 released – ActiveX support. can be used from any language that supports COM including AutoIt, Visual Basic, Perl, VBScript.
 May 2008 2.0.3 released – 64-bit support
 August 2010 2.1 released – Improved permission listing

References

Operating system security
Windows commands